László Lempert (4 June 1952, in Budapest) is a Hungarian-American mathematician, working in the analysis of multiple complex variables. He proved that the Carathéodory and Kobayashi distances agree on convex domains. He further proved that a compact, strictly pseudoconvex real analytic hypersurface can be embedded into the unit sphere of a Hilbert space.

Life 
Lempert graduated from the Eötvös Loránd University in 1975. He was at the Analysis Department of the same university (1977–1988) and is a professor of Purdue University since 1988. He was a visiting research fellow at the Université de Paris VII (1979–1980), visiting lecturer at the Princeton University (1984–1985), and visiting professor at the Eötvös Loránd University (1994–1995).

Degrees, awards
Lempert received the Candidate of the mathematical sciences degree from the Hungarian Academy of Sciences in 1984. He was an invited session speaker at the International Congress of Mathematicians, in Berkeley, California, 1986. He won the Stefan Bergman Prize in 2001. He was elected an external member of the Hungarian Academy of Sciences (2004). In 2012 he became a fellow of the American Mathematical Society.

References

External links 
 Lempert and Webster receive 2001 Bergman Prize, Notices of the American Mathematical Society, 48(2001), 998–999.

1952 births
Living people
20th-century American mathematicians
20th-century Hungarian mathematicians
21st-century American mathematicians
21st-century Hungarian mathematicians
Members of the Hungarian Academy of Sciences
Fellows of the American Mathematical Society